The Men's shot put event  at the 2006 IAAF World Indoor Championships was held on March 10.

Medalists

Note: In 2013 it was revealed that Andrei Mikhnevich, the original silver medalist, tested positive for a prohibited substance at the 2005 World Championships. Since this was his second offense, he was given a lifetime ban and all his results from August 2005 on were annulled.

Results

Qualification
Qualifying perf. 20.30 (Q) or 8 best performers (q) advanced to the Final.

Final

References
Results

Shot
Shot put at the World Athletics Indoor Championships